Weng Hongyang (born 18 June 1999) is a Chinese badminton player. He won his first BWF World Tour title at the 2019 Lingshui China Masters.

Career

Early career
Weng entered the Fuzhou Sports School in 2006, and later the Fujian Sports School in 2009. He joined the provincial sports team in March 2011, and entered the national team in March 2018. In 2019, he won the Lingshui China Masters, defeating Liu Haichao in straight games in the final.

2020–2021
In November 2020, he won the men's singles title of the China National Championships. Weng was part of the Fujian winning team at the 2021 National Games of China.

2022
In the Korea Open, Weng was promoted from the reserves list to enter the main draw. He defeated home favorite Heo Kwang-hee in the first round, and defeated Malaysians Cheam June Wei and Ng Tze Yong to reach the semi-finals. There, he defeated Denmark's Victor Svendsen to reach his career's maiden World Tour Super 500 final. In the final, he defeated Indonesia's Jonatan Christie to win his career's biggest title, despite being one game down and trailing 16–19 in the second. It was his career's biggest win.

In the Asian Championships, Weng was successfully qualified for the main draw. He defeated former World No.1 Srikanth Kidambi and Olympic bronze medalist Anthony Sinisuka Ginting to enter the semi-finals. However, he was defeated by eventual champion Lee Zii Jia in straight games. Despite this, he still won a bronze medal, which was his first medal from a major tournament.

Achievements

Asian Championships 
Men's singles

BWF World Tour (2 titles, 1 runner-up) 
The BWF World Tour, which was announced on 19 March 2017 and implemented in 2018, is a series of elite badminton tournaments sanctioned by the Badminton World Federation (BWF). The BWF World Tour is divided into levels of World Tour Finals, Super 1000, Super 750, Super 500, Super 300, and the BWF Tour Super 100.

Men's singles

BWF International Challenge/Series (1 title) 
Men's singles

  BWF International Challenge tournament
  BWF International Series tournament
  BWF Future Series tournament

References

External links 
 

1999 births
Living people
Sportspeople from Fuzhou
Badminton players from Fujian
Chinese male badminton players
21st-century Chinese people